The XX Corps of the Ottoman Empire (Turkish: 20 nci Kolordu or Yirminci Kolordu) was one of the corps of the Ottoman Army. It was formed during World War I.

World War I

Order of Battle, December 1916 

In December 1916, the corps was structured as follows:

XX Corps (Macedonian Front, Commander: Mirliva Abdülkerim Pasha)
49th Division (Commander: Miralay Mahmut Bey), withdrawn to Turkey on March 19, 1917.  
144th Infantry Regiment (Commander: Kaymakam Adil Bey)
145th Regiment (Commander: Binbaşı Ali Rıza Bey)
146th Regiment (Commander: Kaymakam Schierholz)
46th Artillery Regiment (Commander: Binbaşı M. Behçet Bey).
50th Division (Commander: Kaymakam Şükrü Naili Bey, Chief of Staff: Yüzbaşı Tevfik Bey),withdrawn to Turkey in May 1917.  
157th Infantry Regiment (Commander: Kaymakam Akif Bey)
158th Infantry Regiment (Commander: Binbaşı Nedim Bey)
169th Inıfantry Regiment (Commander: Kaymakam Servet Bey)
50th Artillery Regiment (Commander: Binbaşı Sadık Bey)

Order of Battle, August 1917 
In August 1917, the corps was structured as follows:

XX Corps (Syria-Palestine), Commander was Ali Fuat Cebesoy
16th Division, 54th Division

Order of Battle, June 1918, September 1918 
In June 1918, September 1918, the corps was structured as follows:

XX Corps (Palestine)
26th Division, 53rd Division

After Mudros

Order of Battle, November 1918 
In November 1918, the corps was structured as follows:

XX Corps (Syria)
1st Division, 43rd Division

Order of Battle, January 1919 
In January 1919, the corps was structured as follows:

XX Corps (Anatolia, Ereğli)
23rd Division (Afyon)
3rd Infantry Regiment, 58th Infantry Regiment, 143rd Infantry Regiment
24th Division (Ereğeli)
69th Infantry Regiment, 89th Infantry Regiment, 159th Infantry Regiment

Sources

See also 
Macedonian front (World War I)
Monastir Offensive

Corps of the Ottoman Empire
Military units and formations of the Ottoman Empire in World War I
Bulgaria in World War I
Macedonia under the Ottoman Empire